VH1 Storytellers is the second live album by American recording artist Kanye West. It was released on January 5, 2010, by Roc-A-Fella Records and Def Jam Recordings. Upon release, the album received generally positive reviews from music critics with most praise going towards the performances of West's tracks.

The show was filmed at the Sony Stages in Los Angeles on February 13, 2009. Direction and production design was done by Es Devlin, while lighting design was handled by Martin Phillips and John McGuire.

Background and Recording
The performance lasted eighteen hours. The show's producers cut it to 20 minutes, after getting network approval to expand the episode from its usual one hour. Songs that didn't make the final cut included; Love Lockdown, Homecoming, Street Lights, and Go Hard, while some were made available to be viewed online.

Comments cut included; West reaction to being snubbed by Thom Yorke at the Grammys and asking for Chris Brown to be giving a break for his altercation with Rihanna. Executive producer Bill Flanagan told Reuters "A lot of the stories that Kanye told went long, I tried to get to the essence of his comments."

Critical reception

VH1 Storytellers was met with generally positive reviews from music critics. At Metacritic, the album received an average score of 66, based on six reviews. In a highly positive review, Leah Greenblatt from Entertainment Weekly viewed West as rarely boring and wrote that he "doesn't so much tell stories as pour his id onto the stage in rambling, free-form fragments." Greenblatt continued, describing West's singing and speaking as being done "with a sort of messy, testifying fervor." Writing for PopMatters, Ross Langager branded West's performances on the album as "often-exciting" and opined that "the main appeal of this episode of VH1 Storytellers lies in West's idiosyncratic take on the vaunted 'storytelling' portion of the show."

Andy Kellman was less enthusiastic in AllMusic, claiming that "West repeatedly switches between laying his soul bare and acting like an egomaniac," though Kellman concluded by calling VH1 Storytellers "a nice addition to a hardcore supporter's collection." In a mixed review, Nathan Rabin of The A.V. Club wrote that West "seems to violate the entire spirit of Storytellers" and expressed the viewpoint that "the rambling semi-stories here are disappointingly dull," while Rabin praised West as sounding "tight, accomplished, and polished to a blinding sheen" during performances of some tracks. Similarly, Scott Plagenhoef from Pitchfork observed "less storytelling and more golden age of entertainment-type stuff" from West, claiming that he "should have had a highball in his hand." However, Plagenhoef viewed West as "an entertainer and a perfectionist-- a bang-for-your-buck guy" and wrote: "Those at this taping presumably got their money's worth."

Track listing
 "See You in My Nightmares" – 3:13
 "RoboCop" – 6:17
 "Flashing Lights" – 6:41
 "Amazing" – 8:24
 "Touch the Sky" – 9:53
 "Say You Will" – 7:42
 "Good Life" – 6:30
 "Heartless / Pinocchio Story" – 11:01
 "Stronger" – 4:53

References

External links
 VH1 Storytellers at Metacritic

2010 live albums
Albums produced by Kanye West
Kanye West albums
Roc-A-Fella Records live albums
VH1 Storytellers
Live hip hop albums
Def Jam Recordings live albums